Thornton railway station may refer to:

 Thornton railway station, Yorkshire, England (disused)
 Thornton railway station, New South Wales, Australia
 Thornton Abbey railway station, Lincolnshire, England
 Thornton–Cleveleys railway station, Lancashire, England (disused)
 Thornton-in-Craven railway station, Yorkshire, England (disused)
 Thornton Dale railway station, Yorkshire, England (disused)
 Glenrothes with Thornton railway station, Fife, Scotland
 Ingleton Thornton station, also known as Ingleton (L&NW) railway station, Yorkshire, England (disused)
 Stanlow and Thornton railway station, Cheshire, England